Emma Margaret Asquith, Countess of Oxford and Asquith ( Tennant; 2 February 1864 – 28 July 1945), known as Margot Asquith, was a British socialite, author. She was married to H. H. Asquith, Prime Minister of the United Kingdom, from 1894 until his death in 1928.

Early life

Emma Margaret Tennant was born in Peeblesshire, of Scottish and English descent, the sixth daughter and eleventh child of Sir Charles Tennant, 1st Baronet, an industrialist and politician, and Emma Winsloe. Known always as Margot, Tennant was brought up at The Glen, the family's country estate; Margot and her sister Laura grew up wild and uninhibited. Margot was a "venturesome child", for example roaming the moors, climbing to the top of the roof by moonlight, riding her horse up the front steps of the estate house.  Riding and golf were her lifelong passions.

The two girls were inseparable, entering society together in London in 1881. She and Laura became the central female figures of an aristocratic group of intellectuals called "The Souls" ("You are always talking about your souls," complained Lord Charles Beresford, thereby providing them with a suitable label). Laura married Alfred Lyttelton in 1885 and died in 1888, and Margot's life was strongly impacted by these events.

Mrs Asquith

On 10 May 1894, Margot married H. H. Asquith and became a "spur to his ambition". She brought him into the glittering social world, which he had in no way experienced with his first wife. However, Margot had known her slightly and she always spoke of her warmly. She also became an unenthusiastic stepmother to five children who were bemused by this creature, so different from their quiet mother. "She flashed into our lives like some dazzling bird of paradise, filling us with amazement, amusement, excitement, sometimes with a vague uneasiness as to what she might do next," wrote Violet Asquith.

Margot bore five children of her own, but only two of them survived infancy. Elizabeth Asquith, born in 1897, married Prince Antoine Bibesco of Romania in 1919 and became a writer of some note. Anthony Asquith, born in 1902 became a leading English film director. In 1908, when Asquith became prime minister, Violet was the only child of his first wife still at home, and the two shared a deep interest in politics. In contrast, relations between stepmother and stepdaughter were frequently strained, prompting H. H. Asquith to write lamentingly of how the two were 'on terms of chronic misunderstanding.' A huge house in Cavendish Square in London with a staff of 14 servants was the Asquith home until they moved to the prime minister's residence at 10 Downing Street in 1908. The residence of most importance in the life of the Asquiths was The Wharf in Sutton Courtenay, Oxfordshire, built in 1912. This became their weekend home away from home. It is here that literary, artistic and political luminaries would gather.

She was a staunch opponent of women's suffrage, once saying in a letter that  'women have no reason, very little humour, hardly any sense of honour...and no sense of proportion'.  On holiday in 1909 in Clovelly Court, Devon the Asquiths were followed by suffragettes Elsie Howey, Jessie Kenney and Vera Wentworth, whom Margot recognised again at church and they also hid in her garden, covering plants with the colours of the movement purple, white and green. She attended the debate on the aborted Conciliation Bill with other politicians' wives, and in 1911 she  'seemed highly amused at the earnestness' of women's suffrage lobbyists, whilst near to Constance Lytton and Annie Kenney, who remembered her as unpleasant and sarcastic. In 2012 an article in Votes for Women told of Asquith's 'stealth' journey when travelling with her husband as Prime Minister via Wolverhampton and Holyhead ferry to Dublin, when their ferry was still met by a yacht of Irish Women's Franchise League demanding the female vote be included in the Irish Home Rule Bill.

During World War I Margot Asquith's outspokenness led to a public outcry. For example, she visited a German prisoner of war camp, and she accused her shell-shocked stepson Herbert of being drunk. The negative public and media response may well have contributed to the political downfall of her husband. In 1918 she was publicly attacked in court by Noel Pemberton Billing, a right-wing MP, who was convinced that the nation's war effort was being undermined by homosexuality in high society. He hinted that she was associated with the conspirators. Billing also published a poem written by Lord Alfred Douglas which referred to "merry Margot, bound With Lesbian fillets".

After the war

In 1920 the mansion in Cavendish Square was sold and the Asquiths moved to 44 Bedford Square, a beautiful house formerly occupied by salonière Ottoline Morrell. She became Countess of Oxford and Asquith in 1925 when her husband was granted a peerage.

In the late 1920s, Margot and her husband were seriously in debt: she admitted to owing £15,000 (over £800,000 at 2015 prices) and having pawned her pearls for £2,000 despite, she claimed, having made £18,000 from books and £10,000 from various writings. A whip-round of Liberal sympathisers had to be organised to provide for them.

Her writing style was not always critically accepted—the most famous review of Margot's work came from New York wit Dorothy Parker, who wrote, "The affair between Margot Asquith and Margot Asquith will live as one of the prettiest love stories in all literature". In 1921 humorist Barry Pain published a book called Marge Askinforit, described on the cover as "a rollicking skit on the Margot Asquith memoirs". Wrote Pain in his author's note, "There was a quality in that autobiography which seemed to demand parody." Margot was known for her outspokenness and acerbic wit. A possibly apocryphal but typical story has her meeting the American film actress Jean Harlow and correcting Harlow's mispronunciation of her first name – "No, no; the 't' is silent, as in 'Harlow'." The story was recorded by the Liberal MP Robert Bernays in his diary entry for 26 June 1934, but Bernays does not claim to have witnessed the alleged encounter himself.

Her husband left her only £300 (just over £16,000 at 2015 prices) on his death in 1928 as he had to use his life insurance to provide for his children. She was left in near penury and her financial position caused her constant concern. Thereafter she made money by advising on “matters of taste” in interior design and advertising Wix cigarettes, often issued "IOU"s which she hoped would never be cashed and, beginning before her husband's death, was given regular gifts of money by Lord Beaverbrook. After her husband's death Margot slowly moved down the residential rungs to rooms at the Savoy Hotel. Her final home was in Thurloe Place, Kensington. She told Harold Nicolson that Neville Chamberlain was "the greatest Englishman that ever lived" for signing the Munich Agreement.

Her final overwhelming sadness was the separation from her daughter, Elizabeth, who had been trapped in Bucharest since 1940. Margot schemed for her rescue, but Elizabeth died of pneumonia in April 1945; heartbroken, she outlived her daughter by three months. Margot's diaries covering 1914–16 were published by Oxford University Press in June 2014 as Margot Asquith's Great War Diaries.

Publications
An Autobiography, 1920
My Impressions of America, 1922
Places & Persons, 1925
Lay Sermons, 1927
Octavia, 1928
More Memories, 1933
More or Less about Myself, 1934
"Off the Record", 1943

Arms

References

Further reading
 Ellenberger, Nancy W. Balfour's World: Aristocracy and Political Culture at the Fin de Siècle (2015). excerpt

External links

 
 
 Full text of Margot Asquith, An Autobiography from Project Gutenberg
 
Bodleian Library catalogue of Margot Asquith's private papers
Bodleian Library catalogue of H.H. Asquith's private papers
Bodleian Library catalogue of Lady Violet Bonham Carter's private papers
Parliamentary Archives, Asquith Papers
 

1864 births
1945 deaths
Margot
Scottish autobiographers
British debutantes
Oxford and Asquith
British diarists
Daughters of baronets
People from the Scottish Borders
Scottish people of English descent
Scottish socialites
Spouses of prime ministers of the United Kingdom
Women diarists
20th-century Scottish writers
20th-century British women writers
Tennant family
Anti-suffragists
Wives of knights